Lone Beech is a historic home located at Marion, McDowell County, North Carolina.  It was built between about 1912 and 1915. It is two-story, Neoclassical style dwelling with a broad pedimented two-story ell.  It features a two-story pedimented portico, supported by six fluted Tuscan order columns and a one-story wrap-around porch.  Also on the property are the contributing one-story frame servant's cottage (c. 1912), barn (c. 1912), and privy (c. 1912).

It was listed on the National Register of Historic Places in 1995.

References

Houses on the National Register of Historic Places in North Carolina
Neoclassical architecture in North Carolina
Houses completed in 1915
Houses in McDowell County, North Carolina
National Register of Historic Places in McDowell County, North Carolina
1912 establishments in North Carolina